The Gulfstream Park Oaks is a Grade II American Thoroughbred horse race for three year old fillies, over a distance of one and one-eighth miles on the dirt held annually in March at Gulfstream Park, Hallandale Beach, Florida.  The event currently carries a purse of $250,000.

History
The inaugural running of the event was on 7 April 1971 as The Bonnie Miss Allowance with the conditions to accommodate fillies and mares three-years-old and older who had never won a sweepstakes at a mile or over with it being run on the turf at the about  miles distance. The first running was won by Able Jan who was ridden by Bobby Breen and trained for owner, True Davis Jr. by future Hall of Fame inductee, Horatio Luro. The event was named after Bonnie Donn Jones, daughter of James Donn Jr.,  president of Gulfstream Park from 1961 to 1978. 

In 1972 and 1974 the Bonnie Miss Stakes was run for three year old fillies over a distance of seven furlongs. The event was run in two divisions in 1975 on the turf. Jockey Marco Castaneda won both races, setting a stakes record of 1:42 flat for  miles in the second division aboard Diomedia. The 1976 running of the event as a handicap for fillies and mares, was the last time it would be held on the turf.

Between 1977 and 1980 the event was held over a distance of seven furlongs. The 1979 running was held as a non-wagering exhibition event after the race had four acceptances with Candy Eclair the seven start winner an overwhelming favorite after defeating Davona Dale in the Shirley Jones Handicap. Davona Dale turned the tables and won another seven events, including the Triple Tiara of Thoroughbred Racing and being crowned U.S. Champion Three-Year-Old Filly.

In 1981 the distance of the event was increased to  miles. In 1982 the event was upgraded to Grade III and in 1988 once more to Grade II.

In 2011 the event was renamed to the Gulfstream Oaks and since 2015 has been run as the Gulfstream Park Oaks.

The event has been a prep race to the Triple Tiara of Thoroughbred Racing, including the Kentucky Oaks, the Black-Eyed Susan Stakes and Mother Goose Stakes.

Records
Speed record:
  miles – 1:48.25  Teammate (2006)
  miles – 1:42.00  Diomedia (1975)
 7 furlongs – 1:21.00  Davona Dale (1979)

Margins:
  lengths – Dreaming of Julia  (2013)

Most wins by a jockey:
 5 – John Velazquez (1999, 2003, 2010, 2011, 2013)
 5 – Jerry D. Bailey (1993, 1996, 2000, 2001, 2005)

Most wins by a trainer:
 5 – Claude R. McGaughey III (1993, 1994, 1996, 1997, 2022)

Most wins by an owner:
 2 – Barry K. Schwartz (1986, 1999)
 2 – Edward P. Evans (1991, 2001)
 2 – Ogden Mills Phipps (1993, 1994)
 2 – H. Joseph Allen (1997, 2006)
 2 – West Point Thoroughbreds (2009, 2018)

Winners

Legend:

 
 

Notes:

† The 1979 running attracted only four acceptances with Davona Dale and undefeated Candy Eclair overwhelming favorites the Gulfstream Park administration decide that the event was to be run as a non-betting exhibition race.

See also
 Road to the Kentucky Oaks
 List of American and Canadian Graded races

External links
 2020–21 Gulfstream Park Media Guide

References

1971 establishments in Florida
Horse races in Florida
Gulfstream Park
Flat horse races for three-year-old fillies
Graded stakes races in the United States
Recurring sporting events established in 1971
Grade 2 stakes races in the United States